Kota Baru Parahyangan or KBP is a planned city located at Padalarang, West Bandung Regency in Indonesia. It is developed with the vision and spirit as a City Of Education. Total land area of the township is 1,250 hectares including land for 200 hectares of lakes.

Infrastructures
First stage of the development of the township is completed. In the second stage of development a town center will be built along with 18 hole golf course area, landed house, and other commercial projects. IKEA has a outlet in the township. There is a horizontal Sun clock in the township which is the biggest in Indonesia.

Housing complexes
Each residential cluster of the township is equipped with parks that have different themes. Parks are implemented with the concept of non-formal education through design and game objects. The architectural concept adopts history which is implemented in residential buildings.

  Wangsakerta
  Pitaloka
  Ratnasasih
  Jingganagara
  Banyaksumba
  Larangtapa
  Mayang Padma
  Kamandaka
  Naganingrum
  Candra Resmi
  Tejakancana
  Purbasari

The complexes are equipped with houses built by KBP.

IKEA 
On March 28, 2021, IKEA opened its third store in Kota Baru Parahyangan. It is the first store to open outside of the Greater Jakarta Metropolitan Area.

Although the store was set to open in the latter half of 2020, the opening of the store was delayed to 2021 as a result of the COVID-19 pandemic.

Schools
For formal education, there is a national standard plus schools that refer to American Classical School Curriculum, from the level of kindergarten to high school. Also has been established Bandung Alliance International School, International Foreign Language Academy (ABAI).
Bandung Alliance Intercultural School (BAIS)
This school is located at Jalan Bujanggamanik Kav. 2. It moved from Ciumblueit, after its 52 years of serving.
Website: .

Cahaya Bangsa Classical School (CBCS)
The school is located at Jalan Bujangga Manik Kav. 1 (right before BAIS)

Al-Irsyad Satya Islamic School
The school is an Islamic private school, and is affiliated with Madrasah Irsyad Zuhri Al-Islamiah of Singapore.

Al-Irsyad Mosque
This unique and magnificent mosque, built shape of the cube resembles the Kaaba. If noted, on the wall are the words "Lailahailallah.

Bale Pare (shopping and eating)
There are restaurants such as Olive Chinese Restaurant, Planet Drinks, and many small restaurants. There is one small convenience store called AlfaMart.

Transportation
The township can be accessed by Purbaleunyi Toll Road through the Padalarang toll gate. Shuttle bus operates Parahyangan to Leuwi Panjang route via Purbaleunyi Toll Road.

External links 
 Kota Baru Parahyangan

References

West Bandung Regency
Populated places in West Java
Planned townships in Indonesia
Post-independence architecture of Indonesia